Microsoft ION is Microsoft's self-sovereign identity system. It builds on the Bitcoin blockchain and IPFS through a Sidetree-based DID network.

References

External links 
 https://techcommunity.microsoft.com/t5/identity-standards-blog/ion-we-have-liftoff/ba-p/1441555

Identity management systems